is a railway station in the city of Komaki, Aichi Prefecture,  Japan, operated by Meitetsu.

Lines

Station layout
The station is an underground station with one island platform and one side platform, located in the basement of the Meitetsu Komaki Hotel. The station has automated ticket machines, Manaca automated turnstiles and is staffed.

Platforms

Adjacent stations

|-
!colspan=5|Nagoya Railroad

Station history
Komaki Station was opened on September 23, 1920. The station was relocated underground in 1989. From 1991-2006, it was also the terminal station on the Peachliner people mover project.

Passenger statistics
In fiscal 2017, the station was used by an average of 11,360 passengers daily.

Surrounding area
Meitetsu Komaki Hotel
Komaki High School
Komaki Daiichi Hospital

See also
 List of Railway Stations in Japan
 Peachliner

References

External links

 Official web page 

Railway stations in Japan opened in 1920
Railway stations in Aichi Prefecture
Stations of Nagoya Railroad
Komaki